Toni Whited is the Dale L. Dykema Professor of Business Administration at the Ross School of Business at the University of Michigan. She received her B.A. in economics and French from the University of Oregon in 1984 and then went on to receive her PhD in economics from Princeton University in 1990. She has taught in multiple areas including: finance, econometrics, and macroeconomics. In her work, she has also published over 30 articles in high level economics and finance journals. During her research she covers subjects such as corporate investment corporate cash policy, structural estimation of dynamic models, corporate diversification, and econometric solutions.

She is co-editor of the Journal of Financial Economics.

Honors and awards 

Whited has received honors and awards including:

 Ross Senior Faculty Research Award, 2017 
 Journal of Financial Economics Jensen Prize for Best Paper in Corporate Finance and Organizations, 2014 (second place). 
 Chicago Quantitative Alliance Academic Competition, Second Prize, 2014. 
 Best Associate Editor, Financial Management, 2014. 
 Research associate, National Bureau of Economic Research, 2013–present.
 Rising Star in Finance, 2013. 
 Ross Prize for the Best Paper in Finance Research Letters, 2012. 
 Excellence in Refereeing Award, American Economic Review, 2012. 
 Erwin A. Gaumnitz Distinguished Faculty Award, University of Wisconsin, 2008. 
 Journal of Finance Brattle Prize for Distinguished Corporate Finance Paper, 2007. 
 Journal of Finance Brattle Prize for Outstanding Corporate Finance Paper, 2005. 
 Brattle Prize nomination, Journal of Finance, 2001. 
 National Science Foundation Doctoral Research Fellowship, 1988–1989. 
 National Science Foundation Graduate Fellowship, 1985–1988. 
 1 University of Oregon President's Award, Best Senior Honors Thesis, 1984. 
 Phi Beta Kappa, 1984.

References

External links 

 

Living people
University of Michigan faculty
21st-century American economists
University of Oregon alumni
Princeton University alumni
20th-century American economists
Economists from Michigan
American women economists
Year of birth missing (living people)
20th-century American women
21st-century American women